Chester Carmelite Friary, otherwise Chester Whitefriars, was a friary in the city of Chester in Cheshire, England. The Carmelites were present in Chester from the late 1270s and by the mid-14th century were established as a well-regarded community. Their church and graveyard were popular for burials of the well-to-do and the friary was often mentioned in Chester wills. Their church steeple when rebuilt in 1495 became a useful landmark for ships. The friary was dissolved in 1538. There are no surviving buildings but the street name Whitefriars preserves the memory of the community.

References

Monasteries in Cheshire
Carmelite monasteries in England